The Sly River is a river in northern Algeria, North Africa.
The Sly River is a tributary of the Chelif River and joins the Chelif just east of the town of Sidi ben Thiour.

References

Rivers of Algeria